Richard Deming is the Director of Creative Writing and a Senior Lecturer in English at Yale University, where he has taught since 2002.

An American poet, theorist, and art critic, he is the author of five books: three books of criticism – Listening on All Sides: Toward an Emersonian Ethics of Reading (Stanford University Press, 2008), Art of the Ordinary: The Everyday Domain of Art, Film, Philosophy, and Poetry (Cornell University Press, 2018), and Orson Welles's Touch of Evil (British Film Institute/Bloomsbury, forthcoming) – as well as two collections of poems, Let's Not Call it Consequence (Shearsman Books, 2008) and Day for Night (Shearsman, 2016).

He has also published essays in the collections Looking at Robert Gardner: Essays on His Films and Career (eds. William Rothman and Charles Warren, SUNY Press, 2016), A Power to Translate the World: New Essays on Emerson and International Culture (ed. Ricardo Miguel Alfonso, University Press of New England, 2015), Philosophy and the Films of Charlie Kaufman (ed. David LaRocca, University of Kentucky Press, 2011), Frank O'Hara Now: New Essays on the New York Poet (eds. Robert Hampton and Will Montgomery, Liverpool University Press, 2010), Ronald Johnson: Life and Works (eds. Eric Selinger and Joel Bettridge, Orono: National Poetry Foundation Press, 2008), and I Have Imagined a Center // Wilder than This Region: Essays on Susan Howe (Ed. Sarah Campbell, Cuneiform Press, 2007).

Deming is a member of the editorial boards of Evental Aesthetics and the Yale Review, and has published essays and reviews in Artforum, Framework: The Journal of Cinema and Media, Poetics Today, Notre Dame Review, et al., while his poems have appeared in such publications as Sulfur, Field, Indiana Review, and The Nation, as well as the collection Great American Prose Poems: From Poe to the Present. Deming has also been featured on episodes of the podcastsThis is Not a Pipe and Poemtalk.

Life
Deming graduated from the University at Buffalo, where he studied with Robert Creeley, Charles Bernstein and Susan Howe, earning a Ph.D with Distinction in American Literature and Poetics in 2003.

He is married to the poet Nancy Kuhl; together, they edit the New Haven-based Phylum Press.

He currently teaches at Yale University, where he is also the Director of Creative Writing; in the past, he has taught at Wesleyan University.

Awards
 2009 Norma Farber First Book Award, Let's Not Call It Consequence
 2012 John P. Birkelund Berlin Prize in the Humanities and Fellow at the American Academy in Berlin for Spring 2012
2017 Writer-in-Residence, Gloucester Writers Center.

Works

Poetry

Criticism

References

External links
PennSound Audio Archive: Richard Deming
"Listening to Words," TEDxYale Lecture (Video)
"Interview", Roberto Tejada, Rust Talks 
Author's website

Year of birth missing (living people)
Living people
Yale University faculty
American male poets
University at Buffalo alumni